Lugau is a town in the district Erzgebirgskreis, in the Free State of Saxony, Germany. It is situated 17 km east of Zwickau, and 17 km southwest of Chemnitz. The town has partnerships with Sallaumines (France) and Penzberg (Bavaria).

References 

Erzgebirgskreis